Frederick Eric Fisher (28 July 1924 in Johnsonville, New Zealand – 19 June 1996 in Palmerston North, Manawatu) was a New Zealand cricketer who played in one Test in 1953. He was a medium-pace bowler and useful lower-order batsman.

Cricket career
He played for Wellington from 1951–52 to 1953–54, and Central Districts in 1954–55. In the four matches of the Plunket Shield in 1952-53 he made 138 runs at 27.60 and took 29 wickets at 10.20, including 4 for 26 and 7 for 48 against Auckland (as well as scoring 68 and 19 not out), and 8 for 34 and 3 for 31 against Canterbury.

He was selected to open the bowling in the First Test against the visiting South Africans in March 1953 but took only one wicket in an innings defeat and was never selected again. According to Richard Boock in his biography of Bert Sutcliffe, Fisher was one of several players at the time who "paid the ultimate price for being overweight".

He played in the Hawke Cup from 1955–56 to 1966–67, representing successively Hawke's Bay, Poverty Bay and Southern Hawke's Bay. He also played for Rochdale in the Central Lancashire League.

See also
 One-Test wonder

References

External links
 Eric Fisher at Cricket Archive
 Eric Fisher at Cricinfo

1924 births
1996 deaths
New Zealand Test cricketers
New Zealand cricketers
Central Districts cricketers
Wellington cricketers